Nadi is a 1969 Indian Malayalam-language film, directed by A. Vincent and produced by Hari Pothan. The film stars Prem Nazir, Sharada, Madhu and Kaviyoor Ponnamma. The film had musical score by G. Devarajan. The film is best known for the performance by Prem Nazir, and the songs.

Cast

Prem Nazir as Johnny
Sharada as Stella
Madhu as Sunny
Ambika as Leela
Baby Sumathi as Babymol
P. J. Antony as Varkey
T. R. Omana as Mariya
Thikkurissy Sukumaran Nair as Thomachan
Kaviyoor Ponnamma as Thresia
Adoor Bhasi as Lasar
Alummoodan as Paili
Sankaradi as Ouseph
Adoor Bhavani as Kunjeli
Chachappan as Priest
Jessy as Rosamma
Nellikode Bhaskaran as Chacko
Paravoor Bharathan as Neighbour
Sankar Menon as Rappel
T. K. Chellappan as Pareeth
Kavara Sasankan

Soundtrack
The music was composed by G. Devarajan and the lyrics were written by Vayalar Ramavarma. The songs of the film became chartbusters, and are still popular in Kerala. The song Aayiram Padasarangal Kilungi sung by K. J. Yesudas was selected as the song heard most of times by Malayalis in a survey conducted as a part of the 50th anniversary of the formation of Kerala state in 2006.

References

External links
 

1969 films
1960s Malayalam-language films
Films directed by A. Vincent